Ott Lumi (born 1 December 1978 in Tallinn) is an Estonian politician. He was a member of XI Riigikogu.

References

Living people
1978 births
Isamaa politicians
Members of the Riigikogu, 2007–2011
Tallinn University alumni
Academic staff of Tallinn University
Politicians from Tallinn